The Wisconsin Sports Minute is a radio program that airs seven days a week on approximately 20 stations throughout Wisconsin. The program takes a This Day In History look at memorable and not so memorable sports moments from the Badger State.

In conjunction with the radio program is a Twitter page, @jackeichsays, that offers more and different looks at Wisconsin and Florida sports history.

Jack Eich is the voice of the Wisconsin Sports Minute.  The award-winning sportscaster formerly was a television sports director in Madison and a radio play-by-play broadcaster in Madison. He currently lives in the Tampa, Florida area and is the voice of University of Tampa Spartans baseball, men's/women's basketball and men's /women's soccer. UT is one of the most successful D2 athletic programs in the United States.

External links
Wisconsin Sports Minute

American sports radio programs